Heliophanus pauper is a jumping spider species in the genus Heliophanus.  It was first described by Wanda Wesołowska in 1986 and has been found in Ethiopia, Kenya, South Africa, Zambia and Zimbabwe.

References

Arthropods of Ethiopia
Arthropods of Kenya
Fauna of Zambia
Arthropods of Zimbabwe
Salticidae
Spiders of Africa
Spiders of South Africa
Taxa named by Wanda Wesołowska
Spiders described in 1986